Buerarema is a municipality in the state of Bahia in the North-East region of Brazil. Your mayor is Vinícius Ibrann Dantas Andrade Oliveira.

See also
List of municipalities in Bahia

References

Municipalities in Bahia